The term hereafter or afterlife as described in one or more religions involves the continuation of something after physical death of the body.  That continuation is believed to be of something variously referred to as the "soul", or the "spirit", or the mind.

Hereafter may also refer to:

Film
 After Life (film), a 1998 film edited, written, and directed by Hirokazu Kore-eda
 AfterLife (film), a 2003 film drama set in Scotland directed by Alison Peebles
 Hereafter (film), a 2010 film by Clint Eastwood

Television
 "Hereafter", a 2003 episode of Justice League
 "After Life" (Buffy the Vampire Slayer), a 2001 episode of Buffy the Vampire Slayer
 "After Life" (St. Elsewhere), a 1986 episode of St. Elsewhere
 "Hereafter" (NCIS), a 2013 episode of NCIS

Music
 Hereafter (album), a 2007 power metal album

See also
 Here in After, a 1996 album by Immolation
 Hereafter, and After, a fantasy novella by Richard Parks
 Afterlife (disambiguation)
 After death (disambiguation)
 The Sweet Hereafter (disambiguation)